Sanna Kyllönen, née Hernesniemi (born 9 March 1971, in Kokkola) is a retired Finnish woman sprinter, who specialized in the 100 and 200 metres.

International competitions

External links

1971 births
Living people
People from Kokkola
Finnish female sprinters
Athletes (track and field) at the 1992 Summer Olympics
Athletes (track and field) at the 1996 Summer Olympics
Athletes (track and field) at the 2000 Summer Olympics
Olympic athletes of Finland
Sportspeople from Central Ostrobothnia